Carl Tietjens (born 25 March 1986) is an Australian cricketer. He played in three first-class matches for South Australia between 2011 and 2013.

See also
 List of South Australian representative cricketers

References

External links
 

1986 births
Living people
Australian cricketers
South Australia cricketers
Cricketers from Adelaide